On 26 February 2023, a boat carrying migrants sank amidst harsh weather conditions while trying to land on the coast of Steccato di Cutro, a seaside resort village near the town of Crotone, in the region of Calabria in southern Italy. The boat was carrying about 200 migrants when it sank, of whom at least 86 died, including at least 24 children. Eighty-one people were rescued.

Background 

According to the International Organization for Migration, over 20,000 people have died or gone missing on the Central Mediterranean route between North Africa and Italy since 2014. According to the European Union migration and asylum policy, migrants travelling from Turkey to Italy are also considered to be using the Central Mediterranean route. The Central Mediterranean route has been one of the most active despite the dangers it poses, making Italy one of the most common landing countries, although many continue on to northern European countries.

Incident 
A Frontex aircraft, monitoring the area as part of Operation Themis to support Italy with border control, surveillance and search and rescue in the central Mediterranean, intercepted a ship on the evening of 25 February 2023. Frontex saw only one person on board according to the camera, but other elements, such as the thermal camera recording, indicated the possibility of the presence of a large number of people; a report was immediately communicated to Italian authorities. Two patrol boats of Guardia di Finanza tried to intercept the ship, but they returned to port due to adverse weather and sea conditions, which was 4 out of 7 on the Douglas sea scale (waves rising up to ).

On 26 February 2023, a boat that had set sail from İzmir, Turkey, a few days earlier sank off the southern coast of Crotone, Calabria, Italy. According to the Italian news agency Adnkronos, more than 100 people were aboard the boat when it sank, and they were from Iran, Pakistan, and Afghanistan. Other local agencies mentioned that there were migrants from Iraq, Syria, and Somalia as well. The Anadolu Agency said that the boat carried "some 200 people", while survivors stated that the number was between 150 and 240. 

The boat sank while attempting to land after it crashed into rocks in rough weather conditions. Video footage of the incident shows timber from the boat broken into pieces and floating along the beach. Parts of the boat's hull were also seen washing up along the seashore. An official said that wreckage was strewn along  of beach.

Motorboats, vessels, and a helicopter were deployed to help with rescue efforts. Firefighters on jet skis were also deployed, but operations were complicated due to harsh weather conditions. According to the Italian Coast Guard, 80 people were found alive.

Victims 
As of 13 March 2023 it is reported least 79 people were killed in the sinking, including 16 children, one of whom was a baby less than one year old. Eighty-one people have been rescued. The Pakistani Embassy in Rome has revealed that the bodies of 28 Pakistanis have been recovered.  

Among the victims is Shahida Raza, a former Pakistani field hockey player. 54 of the survivors have been identified as Afghans, 3 were Pakistanis, a Syrian, a Tunisian and a Palestinian.

Investigations 
One of the survivors has been arrested on migrant trafficking charges.
On 28 February 2023, Italian police arrested a Turkish man and two Pakistani nationals on grounds of people-smuggling.

The European Union's border agency and the Italian Coast Guard are under investigation. Many are questioning their response time after information of spotting the boat before the wreck was announced. It is now known the boat was spotted late on 25 February through thermal cameras before the boat was in distress. After a failed attempt to reach the boat due to inclement weather, no other action was taken until the wreck response.

Reactions

Domestic 

Prime minister Giorgia Meloni expressed her "deep sorrow for the many human lives torn away by human traffickers", and condemned the "exchange" of migrants' lives for "the 'price' of a ticket paid by them in the false prospect for a safe voyage". She has urged European law makers for change and action against migration laws to ensure these terrible events don't happen again. 

Interior minister Matteo Piantedosi stressed the importance of stopping sea crossings that offer migrants the "illusory mirage of a better life" in Europe. Antonio Ceraso, the mayor of Cutro, said that he saw "a spectacle that you would never want to see in your life ... stays with you for all your life".

On 2 March, president Sergio Mattarella went to Crotone to pay respects to the bodies of the victims, being the first and only office holder to do so.

On 9 March, the Meloni government had an official meeting in Cutro, in which the cabinet approved a decree introducing tougher penalties for migrant smugglers.

International 
Pope Francis said that he was "praying for everyone caught up in the shipwreck" in his Sunday address at St. Peter's Square.

Shehbaz Sharif, the Pakistani Prime Minister, stated that more than two dozen Pakistani nationals were on the boat when it sunk. Sharif said that the reports were "concerning and worrisome".

See also 
 List of migrant vessel incidents on the Mediterranean Sea

References 

2023 disasters in Italy
2023 in international relations
21st century in Calabria
Disasters in Calabria
February 2023 events in Italy
Illegal immigration to Italy
Maritime incidents in 2023
Maritime incidents in Italy
Migrant boat disasters in the Mediterranean Sea
Province of Crotone